Charles Myers may refer to:

 Charles Samuel Myers (1873–1946), English physician and psychologist
 Charles G. Myers (1810–?), American lawyer and politician
 Charles Andrew Myers (1913–2000), American labor economist
 Charles E. Myers (1925-2016), American aerospace innovator and engineer 
 Charles F. Myers, author and screenwriter, also known by the pen name Henry Farrell